Xiantao is a city in Hubei, China.

Xiantao may also refer to:
Peaches of Immortality in Chinese mythology
Xiantao Subdistrict, Yubei District, Chongqing, China